Lee Choon-Huan (born May 9, 1980) is a two-time Olympic modern pentathlete from South Korea. He won a gold medal for the team relay, and an individual silver at the 2010 Asian Games in Guangzhou, China. Lee also led his team to win the silver medal at the 2011 World Modern Pentathlon Championships in Moscow, emerging him as one of South Korea's most prominent modern pentathletes in an international level.

Lee first competed at the 2004 Summer Olympics in Athens, Greece, where he finished in twenty-first place, with a score of 5,068 points. He continued to improve his performance at his second Olympics in Beijing, but a discontinuous riding segment affected and hampered his chances of reaching the top position in the men's event, as he finished abruptly in thirty-third place.

References

External links
 

1980 births
Living people
South Korean male modern pentathletes
Olympic modern pentathletes of South Korea
Modern pentathletes at the 2004 Summer Olympics
Modern pentathletes at the 2008 Summer Olympics
Asian Games medalists in modern pentathlon
Modern pentathletes at the 2010 Asian Games
World Modern Pentathlon Championships medalists
Asian Games gold medalists for South Korea
Asian Games silver medalists for South Korea
Medalists at the 2010 Asian Games
20th-century South Korean people
21st-century South Korean people